Kevin Charles Dean (born April 1, 1969) is an American former professional ice hockey player and current assistant coach with the Chicago Blackhawks in the National Hockey League (NHL). Dean played seven seasons in the NHL for the New Jersey Devils, Atlanta Thrashers, Dallas Stars, and Chicago Blackhawks.

Playing career
Kevin Dean was drafted 86th overall in the 1987 NHL Entry Draft by the New Jersey Devils. He then played four years at the University of New Hampshire before transferring to the American Hockey League (AHL). In 1994–95 Dean helped the Albany River Rats win the AHL's Calder Cup championship. He made his NHL debut the same season and was a member of the Stanley Cup champion New Jersey Devils. Following a few seasons transferring between the minors and NHL, the Atlanta Thrashers claimed Dean in the 1999 NHL Expansion Draft. He would play for multiple teams in the NHL but never secure a permanent spot, retiring in 2002. Kevin Dean had to stop playing due to heart problems after ten years.

Coaching career
Kevin Dean then became head coach of the Trenton Devils, the ECHL team owned and affiliated with the New Jersey Devils, from August 2006 through the 2010–11 season, after which the team suspended operations.

Prior to the 2011–12 season, he was named an assistant coach with the Providence Bruins of the American Hockey League. He became the P-Bruins head coach on July 18, 2016. One season later, he was again promoted within the Bruins' organization to be an assistant coach with the Boston Bruins.

Career statistics

Regular season and playoffs

International

Awards and honors

References

External links

1969 births
Living people
Albany River Rats players
American men's ice hockey defensemen
Atlanta Thrashers players
Chicago Blackhawks players
Cincinnati Cyclones (ECHL) players
Dallas Stars players
Sportspeople from Madison, Wisconsin
Ice hockey coaches from Wisconsin
Milwaukee Admirals players
New Hampshire Wildcats men's ice hockey players
New Jersey Devils draft picks
New Jersey Devils players
Stanley Cup champions
Utica Devils players
Cincinnati Cyclones (IHL) players
Culver Academies alumni
Ice hockey players from Wisconsin